ERB-dom was a magazine devoted to the works of Edgar Rice Burroughs created by Al Guillory, Jr. and Camille Cazedessus Jr. ("Caz"). It began publication in May 1960 as a mimeographed science-fiction fanzine.

Guillory was killed in a car-train collision, but Cazedessus continued publishing ERB-dom. It won the Hugo Award for Best Fanzine in 1966.

ERB-dom was eventually printed in color, containing Russ Manning's Tarzan newspaper comic strip pages in color and the daily strips. It went to monthly publication in 1970 and then back to five times per year. It ceased publication with issue #89 in late 1976.

Successor titles
Cazedessus renewed his publishing efforts with The Fantasy Collector (later The Fantastic Collector) in December 1988. He soon re-incorporated ERB-dom-type articles into the magazine, which was tending more towards pulp fiction in general (not just fantasy). The title was changed to Pulpdom, Son of ERB-dom by Cazedessus in 1997. It continues under that name featuring articles and illustrations on almost all the pulp authors, from Edgar Rice Burroughs to H. Bedford-Jones, et al. It "concentrates on the pre-1932 pulps, obscure authors of the 'fantastic,' and particularly Argosy, All-Story and the early Blue Book."

Notes

External links
 Pulpdom official website
 ERB-dom Index
 

1960 establishments in California
1976 disestablishments in California
Monthly magazines published in the United States
Defunct science fiction magazines published in the United States
Edgar Rice Burroughs
Hugo Award-winning works
Magazines established in 1960
Magazines disestablished in 1976
Magazines published in Los Angeles
Science fiction fanzines